Becoming Nigerian styled as Be(com)ing Nigerian: A Guide is a 2019 novel by Nigerian satirist Elnathan John. It is his second novel. It was published in 2019 by Cassava Republic.

Plot summary
Elnathan John addresses topics including election, politics in Nigeria, the Nigerian police, healthcare,  and "the hustle."

Reception
 Top 10 Nigerian Books of 2019 by Channels Television.

References 

2019 Nigerian novels
Parody novels
Political satire novels
Cassava Republic Press books